Ali Ghorbani (born 18 September 1990) is an Iranian professional footballer, who plays as a forward for Foolad in the Persian Gulf Pro League. He represents the Azerbaijan national football team.

Club career
Ghorbani started his professional career with Nassaji. Later he joined Gahar and reunited with his former coach Davoud Mahabadi, helping them secure promotion to Iran Pro League with scoring 7 times in Azadegan League. After a successful season in Gahar, he joined Mes Sarcheshmeh. In July 2013, he joined Naft Tehran on a two-year contract.

Esteghlal
Ghorbani joined Sepidrood in summer 2016. He was coached by Alireza Mansourian at Naft Tehran and when Mansorian went to Esteghlal, Ghorbani was one of his new players. Scoring goal against Perspolis in Tehran Derby led to his popularity among Esteghlal fans.

Spartak Trnava
On 3 September 2018, Ghorbani joined Slovakian side Spartak Trnava on a two-year contract.

Sepahan
In the summer of 2019, he joined Iranian Club Sepahan. After getting knocked out by former team Esteghlal on 10 August 2020, he and a few other club members were sacked by the club.

Sumgayit FK
On 14 August 2020, he signed a one year contract with Azerbaijan Premier League club Sumgayit FK.

International career
Ali Ghorbani was born in the Mazandaran province of Iran and originally is a mazani from Kerdabad village in Savadkouh. On 2 October 2020, Ghorbani was called up Azerbaijan by Gianni De Biasi.

He made his official debut for Azerbaijan on 10 October 2020, against Montenegro in a UEFA Nations League match.

Career statistics

Club

 Assist Goals

International

Statistics accurate as of match played 10 October 2020

Honours
Esteghlal
Hazfi Cup (1): 2017–18
Spartak Trnava
Slovnaft Cup (1): 2018–19

References

External links

Ali Ghorbani at IranLeague.ir
Ali Ghorbani at PersianLeague.com

1990 births
Living people
People from Savadkuh
Association football forwards
Citizens of Azerbaijan through descent
Azerbaijani footballers
Azerbaijan international footballers
Iranian footballers
Azerbaijani people of Iranian descent
Sportspeople of Iranian descent
Iranian emigrants to Azerbaijan
Nassaji Mazandaran players
Gahar Zagros players
Mes Sarcheshme players
Naft Tehran F.C. players
Esteghlal F.C. players
FC Spartak Trnava players
Sepahan S.C. footballers
Sumgayit FK players
Persian Gulf Pro League players
Azadegan League players
Slovak Super Liga players
Expatriate footballers in Slovakia
Iranian expatriate sportspeople in Slovakia
Azerbaijan Premier League players
Sportspeople from Mazandaran province